Seditious conspiracy is a crime in various jurisdictions of conspiring against the authority or legitimacy of the state. As a form of sedition, it has been described as a serious but lesser counterpart to treason, targeting activities that undermine the state without directly attacking it.

Common law

In common law jurisdictions, seditious conspiracy is an agreement by two or more persons to do any act with the intention to excite hatred or contempt against the persons or institutions of state, to excite the alteration by unlawful means of a state or church matter established by law, to raise discontent among the people, or to promote ill will and enmity between classes. Criticising a policy or state institution for the purpose of obtaining lawful reform is not seditious. Seditious conspiracy, like other forms of sedition, developed during the late medieval period to apply to activities that threatened the social order but fell short of constructive treason. Enforcement of both types of offence under the Tudors and Stuarts grew increasingly harsh; courts judged the accused's intentions suspiciously, allowing juries to decide only whether the alleged events had occurred. A trend of jury nullifications in the 18th century ultimately limited the scope of seditious crimes.

Charges of seditious conspiracy were notably brought in the United Kingdom against Irish radicals and Chartists in the 19th century before being abolished in 2010. The charge has been used against labour activists in both Canada and Australia, such as the leaders of the 1919 Winnipeg general strike and the Sydney Twelve. In British India, the charge was used to imprison independence activists, and the extension of their imprisonment by the 1919 Rowlatt Act led to Mahatma Gandhi's call for nonviolent resistance.

In Canada, the maximum sentence for seditious conspiracy is 14 years in jail.

United States
In the United States, seditious conspiracy is codified at :

This law was enacted in 1861 after secessionists gained control of most slaveholding states as the Confederate States of America, although it was originally sought by Senator Stephen A. Douglas in response to John Brown's 1859 raid on a federal arsenal. A substantially similar offense appeared in the Sedition Act of 1798 signed by President John Adams to suppress the Democratic-Republican Party's criticisms of the Quasi-War. However, the law was deeply unpopular and was allowed to expire after Thomas Jefferson defeated Adams in the 1800 presidential election. After Nat Turner's slave rebellion, the Virginia General Assembly amended the state slave codes to enact charges similar to seditious conspiracy against slaves and free blacks who held unauthorized assemblies or led slave rebellions.

Notable cases

Puerto Rican nationalists
Puerto Rican nationalists seeking the island's independence from the United States have been charged and convicted on multiple occasions. In 1936, Pedro Albizu Campos and other leaders of the Puerto Rican Nationalist Party were prosecuted. Another seventeen members of the PRNP were charged after four of them carried out the 1954 Capitol shooting. In 1980, Puerto Rican Nationalist Carmen Valentín Pérez and nine others were charged, and were each given sentences of up to 90 years in prison.

Far-right groups
Seditious conspiracy charges have been brought several times, for the most part unsuccessfully, against far-right groups, including white nationalists and followers of the Patriot movement, whose adherents espouse a belief that the federal government is illegitimate.

In 1940 the government arrested seventeen members of the Christian Front, followers of fascistic broadcaster Father Charles Coughlin. All of the charges ended in dismissal or acquittal. In the Fort Smith sedition trial, Louis Beam and nine other white supremacists were indicted for the activities of The Order and The Covenant, The Sword, and the Arm of the Lord. All ten defendants and four other defendants indicted for different crimes were acquitted in April 1988 after a two-month trial. In 2010, nine members of Hutaree were charged. They were acquitted due to the prosecution's overreliance on circumstantial evidence.

In 2010 the United States Department of Justice attempted to prosecute the Christian nationalist Hutaree militia of Lenawee County, Michigan, for seditious conspiracy. Judge Victoria A. Roberts of the United States District Court for the Eastern District of Michigan ordered the seditious conspiracy charges to be dismissed under First Amendment grounds.

January 6 attacks 
Several members of American far-right militias were charged with seditious conspiracy for their participation in the January 6 United States Capitol attack, in which a mob of the outgoing President Donald Trump's supporters attacked the United States Capitol in an attempt to prevent the 2021 United States Electoral College vote count formally certifying his successor Joe Biden's victory in the 2020 United States presidential election. Eleven members of the Oath Keepers, including leader Stewart Rhodes, were charged with seditious conspiracy in January 2022 for allegedly conspiring to stop the presidential transition of Joe Biden. By the following May, three Oath Keeper members had pled guilty to the charges. That November, Rhodes and the Florida Oath Keeper Kelly Meggs were convicted by a jury of the charge. Three other Oath Keeper leaders were acquitted, but found guilty of other felonies.  In January 2023, four more Oath Keepers were convicted of seditious conspiracy and other charges, bringing the total number of Oath Keepers guilty of the charge to 9.  They had been charged alongside Rhodes and others, but tried separately due to the number of defendants. 

In June 2022, five Proud Boys leaders, including their former chairman Enrique Tarrio, were similarly charged. In October, a sixth Proud Boy leader pled guilty to seditious conspiracy, as well as a weapons charge, as part of a cooperation agreement.

After the public hearings of the United States House Select Committee on the January 6 Attack, some legal analysts and political commentators argued that enough evidence existed for an indictment of Trump himself for seditious conspiracy either in connection with the attack or his attempts to overturn the 2020 United States presidential election in general. President Biden and certain special interest groups such as the National Association of Manufacturers had already previously accused Trump of sedition for his speech at the rally before the attack. Members of the House January 6 Committee were alarmed at Cassidy Hutchinson's testimony that Trump demanded to be driven to the Capitol and lunged for the wheel of the presidential SUV as direct evidence. United States Department of Justice prosecutors involved in the seditious conspiracy cases against the Proud Boys and the Oath Keepers attempted to block the defendants from blaming Trump in their defenses on the basis that he had no political authority to order such a conspiracy.

Islamist terrorism 
In 1995 Sheikh Omar Abdel-Rahman, a prominent Muslim cleric, and nine others were convicted of seditious conspiracy for planning to bomb New York City landmarks after the 1993 World Trade Center bombing.

In 1996, after his Declaration of War against the Americans Occupying the Land of the Two Holy Places stating al-Qaeda's intention to carry out terrorist attacks on the United States, the United States Attorney for the Southern District of New York allowed the Federal Bureau of Investigation to begin investigating Osama bin Laden under the charge of seditious conspiracy.

Others
The government charged three members of the Buffalo, New York-based El Ariete Society, a Communist group, in 1920. The defendants were acquitted by a judge as the government failed to prove that the defendants had any connection with the seditious publications that were presented as evidence, or that any active conspiracy had existed.

Three members of the United Freedom Front, a Marxist group, were convicted in 1989 for a series of attacks against corporate, government, and military targets.

See also
List of conspiracies (political)
Sedition

References

External links
18 U.S.C. § 2384 : US Code - Section 2384: Seditious conspiracy

Conspiracy (criminal)
Sedition
United States federal criminal law
Terrorism in the United States